Arthur Delaporte (born 7 October 1991) is a French politician. He is a Member of Parliament for Calvados's 2nd constituency. He was elected at the 2022 French legislative election.

References

1991 births
Living people
Socialist Party (France) politicians
Politicians from Caen
Deputies of the 16th National Assembly of the French Fifth Republic
Lycée Henri-IV alumni
ENS Fontenay-Saint-Cloud-Lyon alumni
Sciences Po alumni
Pantheon-Sorbonne University alumni